Neil Mullane Finn  (born 27 May 1958) is a New Zealand singer-songwriter and musician who is known for being a member of Split Enz (which he co-fronted with brother Tim), Crowded House and Fleetwood Mac. Finn rose to prominence in the late 1970s with Split Enz and wrote many of the band's most successful songs, including "One Step Ahead", "History Never Repeats", "I Got You", and "Message to My Girl". 

After Split Enz broke up in 1984, Finn founded Crowded House with Split Enz's final drummer Paul Hester in 1985 and served as the band's lead singer. The group achieved international success in 1987 when they released the single "Don't Dream It's Over", written by Finn. After Crowded House disbanded in 1996, Finn and his brother released two albums as the Finn Brothers, before reforming Crowded House in 2006. In April 2018, Finn joined Fleetwood Mac for their forthcoming tour that year. Finn has also recorded several successful solo albums and assembled diverse musicians for the 7 Worlds Collide project.

Ed O'Brien of Radiohead has hailed Finn as popular music's "most prolific writer of great songs".

Early life
Finn was born the youngest of four children to Dick and Mary Finn in Te Awamutu, New Zealand. His mother, a devout Catholic who moved to New Zealand from Ireland at the age of two, maintained a religious influence over the family. Speaking of Catholicism, Finn stated "It's a great fertile ground for pulling lyrics out. [There's] lots of good stuff going on in there, good rituals and imagery and lots of guilt. It's a very potent combination. I think you're blessed, really, to be brought up with some kind of weird dogma like that." His father, the son of a farmer from Waikato, served in the army in Italy and became an accountant during World War II.  His parents instilled an "inspiring admiration of music" in young Finn; the family would often engage in sing-alongs around the family piano. In addition to music, Finn also enjoyed sports, particularly swimming, rugby, tennis, and biking.

As a child, Finn would often perform at family gatherings with his older brother Tim. Finn recalled, "We'd sing all night. It was very much part of our upbringing.... That was the first inkling of the seduction of live performance." He idolised his brother and wished to imitate his actions, learning to play guitar and piano at the same time Tim did. Tim was more public about his musical aspirations, and won ten shillings in his annual talent contest at school shortly after enrolling. When Tim left to study at Sacred Heart College, a boarding school in Auckland, eight-year-old Neil started playing a guitar that his older brother left behind. A natural performer, Finn was nicknamed 'The Ant' by his family due to his determined and ambitious nature.

Finn attended Sacred Heart boarding school in Auckland and Te Awamutu College. He decided to become a musician at the age of 12 and throughout his school years performed in prisons and hospitals, as well as at home gatherings.

Career

1977–1984: Split Enz

In 1976, Finn formed the group After Hours, with Mark Hough, Geoff Chunn, and Alan Brown. Not long after the band's debut performance, Finn's brother Tim invited him to join Split Enz in London, replacing original singer-songwriter Phil Judd. By 1980, he was sharing lead singer duties and wrote their first international hit, "I Got You". Finn contributed significantly to the band's later albums, and even briefly assumed leadership in the band's final days when Tim Finn left in 1984.

1985–1996: Crowded House

After the breakup of Split Enz in 1984, Finn formed a new band called The Mullanes (Mullane being both his middle name and his mother's maiden name) with Split Enz drummer Paul Hester, guitarist Craig Hooper (of The Reels), and bassist Nick Seymour (younger brother of Hunters & Collectors leader Mark Seymour) who Finn met on the final Split Enz tour. Hooper left just before they recorded their first album, at which time the band was renamed Crowded House, inspired by the rental home they shared while recording in Los Angeles.

Crowded House went on to enjoy worldwide acclaim; particularly, with its two major hits "Don't Dream It's Over" (1987: US No. 2; Canada and New Zealand No. 1) and "Weather With You" (1992: UK No. 7). Both Neil and his brother Tim were appointed as Officers of the Order of the British Empire (OBE) for services to music in the 1993 Queen's Birthday Honours. After releasing four albums—Crowded House, Temple of Low Men, Woodface, and Together Alone, the group broke up in 1996 and soon after released their greatest hits album Recurring Dream.

1997–2006: Solo work
Following the breakup of Crowded House, Finn embarked on a solo career. The album Afterglow was released in 1999, which contained previously unreleased Crowded House recordings. Finn appeared as part of the BBC Four's Songwriters' Circle series in 1999, and explained that "Don't Dream It's Over" and "Better Be Home Soon" were both written quickly, with all of the elements of each song—such as lyrics and verses—emerging at the same time. Finn also sang the opening lines of The Verve song "The Drugs Don't Work" to the opening chords of the latter song. Finn penned a theme song for the All Blacks' participation in the 1999 Rugby World Cup, "Can You Hear Us?", that made it to the top of the New Zealand charts in October.

Finn has recorded four solo albums, Try Whistling This (1998), One Nil (2001), Dizzy Heights (2014), and Out of Silence (2017). One Nil was released in the US and Canada in a remixed version with two new tracks, one track deleted and reordering, and was renamed One All (2002). Neil and Tim Finn also collaborated on a Finn Brothers album, Finn, that was released in 1995.

In 2001, Finn released a live album/DVD (7 Worlds Collide) consisting of songs recorded at St James Theatre in Auckland with several other artists. Finn was also heavily involved in creating the 2001 soundtrack for the motion picture Rain. Everyone Is Here, a second Finn Brothers album, was released in 2004.

2006–present: Reformation of Crowded House, family collaborations and Fleetwood Mac
In January 2007, Crowded House reformed with Finn, Nick Seymour, Mark Hart, and new drummer Matt Sherrod, as Paul Hester had died in 2005. The group's new album Time on Earth was released in June 2007. In the pre-release build up, they headlined a show at Coachella in April 2007. The band then commenced a world tour.

Finn appeared on fellow musician Missy Higgins' CD, On a Clear Night (2007).

Finn and his wife Sharon began a side project called Pajama Club in 2011. After Finn's children, Liam and Elroy, left the family home to pursue their own musical careers, the two wondered what to do to fill the time left open by their children's absence. The two decided to repair the music room in their Auckland home and begin making music of their own: "We've had a bit more time on our hands since the boys left home, and we just decided to make a record. It was as simple as that. We called the group Pajama Club, because we were dressed in our pyjamas when we started." Sharon began to play the bass guitar and Neil sat behind the drum set, despite the fact that neither had played either instrument before.

On 23 October 2011, Finn performed with Ryan Adams and Janis Ian on BBC Four's Series 2 Episode 4 of the series, Songwriters' Circle. The night resulted in controversy, ending with an awkward exchange between the performers when there seemingly was confusion between them about who was to perform and join in on each other's songs.

During February and March 2013, Finn and Paul Kelly undertook their collaborative Goin' Your Way Tour of Australia. One of their performances at the Sydney Opera House was recorded for the live album, Goin' Your Way (8 November 2013). It was issued as a double CD, which peaked at No. 5 on the ARIA Albums Chart. It was also issued as a DVD, which peaked at No. 1 on the ARIA Music DVD Chart.

Finn's solo album, Dizzy Heights, was released in Australia and New Zealand on 7 February 2014 via Kobalt Label Services. His sons and his wife also play on the album. Dizzy Heights is his third solo album. 

On 15 April 2018, Fleetwood Mac announced that Finn had joined the band along with Heartbreakers' lead guitarist Mike Campbell. Both Finn and Campbell toured with Fleetwood Mac in the concert tour An Evening with Fleetwood Mac from October 2018 to November 2019.

In August 2018, Finn released the album Lightsleeper as a collaboration with his son Liam.

Charity work
In 1986, Finn performed with The Rock Party, a charity project initiated by the National Campaign Against Drug Abuse (NCADA) that included many Australasian musicians such as Reg Mombassa from Mental As Anything, Tim Finn, and Nick Seymour and Paul Hester of Crowded House. The Rock Party released a 12" single entitled "Everything To Live For".

In December 2008, several of the 7 Worlds Collide lineup reconvened in Auckland, New Zealand to record The Sun Came Out, a charity album for Oxfam.

In March 2009, Neil Finn, with his son Liam, joined Tim Finn on stage at Melbourne's charity Sound Relief concert at the Melbourne Cricket Ground, in support of the 2009 Victorian bushfires. Liam Finn played drums on a rendition of the Crowded House song "Weather With You".

Film and television
Finn has contributed solo music to various film and TV soundtracks including Rain, Boston Legal, Boston Public, The Waiting Game, Antz, and Sports Night. In 2012, Finn recorded the song "Song of the Lonely Mountain", which was featured in the end credits of Peter Jackson's film adaptation The Hobbit: An Unexpected Journey.

Finn had a cameo acting role on the BBC Radio series Flight of the Conchords.

In 2023, Finn provided a voice cameo for the Australian childrens TV series Bluey in the third season.

Personal life
Finn married Sharon Dawn Johnson in February 1982. Finn and his wife have two sons, Liam Finn and Elroy Finn. Both sons are musicians.

Solo discography
This discography relates to solo releases by Neil Finn only. See Split Enz discography, Crowded House discography and The Finn Brothers' discography for other related works.

Albums

Live albums

Singles

Other contributions

As performer
Diana, Princess of Wales: Tribute (1997) - "Don't Dream It's Over (acoustic)"
Antz soundtrack (1998) – "I Can See Clearly Now"
Andrew Denton Musical Challenge (2000) – "Billie Jean"
Andrew Denton's Musical Challenge Volume 2: Even More Challenged (2001) – "Sexual Healing"
Through Space To Your Place (2001) – "Norwegian Wood"
Live at the World Café: Vol. 15 - Handcrafted (2002, World Café) – "Driving Me Mad"
107.1 KGSR Radio Austin - Broadcasts Vol.10 (2002) – "Private Universe"
Maybe This Christmas (2002) – "Sweet Secret Peace"
The Hobbit: An Unexpected Journey (2012) – "Song of the Lonely Mountain"

As producer
 "No Commotion" (1983, single) - Karen Ansel
Greenstone (1994, album) - Emma Paki
Twist (1994, album) - Dave Dobbyn
Nature (1995, album) - The Mutton Birds
Moana and The Moahunters (1998, album) - Moana and the Moahunters
Brand New (1999, album) (as executive producer) - The Stereo Bus
Soul Lost Companion (1999, album) - Mark Lizotte

As session musician
Just Drove Thru Town (1979, album) - Citizen Band
Sing (1984, album) - Big Choir
 "Everything To Live For" (1986, maxi-single) - The Rock Party
Rikki & Pete (1988, soundtrack)

Awards and nominations

APRA Awards
 2002 Silver Scroll Award: "Turn and Run" 
 Most Performed Work Overseas (1994): Neil Finn & Tim Finn, "Weather With You"  (with Crowded House)
 Most Performed Work Overseas (1995, 2000–1, 2003 – present):   Neil Finn, "Don't Dream It's Over" (with Crowded House)

Countdown Australian Music Awards
Countdown was an Australian pop music TV series on national broadcaster ABC-TV from 1974 to 1987, it presented music awards from 1979 to 1987, initially in conjunction with magazine TV Week. The TV Week / Countdown Awards were a combination of popular-voted and peer-voted awards.

|-
|1980
| himself - Split Enz
| Best Recorded Song Writer
| 
|-
|1981
| himself
| Most Popular Male Performer
| 
|-
| 1984
| himself
| Best Songwriter
| 
|-
| 1986
| himself
| Best Songwriter
| 
|-

Helpmann Awards
The Helpmann Awards is an awards show, celebrating live entertainment and performing arts in Australia, presented by industry group Live Performance Australia since 2001. Note: 2020 and 2021 were cancelled due to the COVID-19 pandemic.
 

! 
|-
| 2013
| Neil Finn and Paul Kelly
| Helpmann Award for Best Australian Contemporary Concert
| 
| 
|-

RIANZ New Zealand Music Awards 
The New Zealand Music Awards are awarded annually by the RIANZ in New Zealand.

References
Citations

Sources

Bibliography

External links

AudioCulture profile
Neil Finn: Songwriter
Interview with Neil Finn : The Pajama Club
Trouser Press commentary on Crowded House, Neil Finn and Tim Finn discography

1958 births
Living people
APRA Award winners
New Zealand people of Irish descent
Crowded House members
New Zealand expatriates in Australia
New Zealand expatriates in the United States
New Zealand expatriates in England
New Zealand male guitarists
Lead guitarists
New Zealand singer-songwriters
New Zealand pop singers
New Zealand Roman Catholics
New Zealand songwriters
Male songwriters
New Zealand new wave musicians
New Zealand Officers of the Order of the British Empire
People from Te Awamutu
Split Enz members
Pajama Club members
Fleetwood Mac members
New Zealand session musicians
20th-century New Zealand musicians
20th-century New Zealand male singers
21st-century New Zealand musicians
21st-century New Zealand male singers
Neil
People educated at Te Awamutu College